Ted Gibson (born 7 June 1962) is a Canadian rower. He competed in the men's coxless four event at the 1984 Summer Olympics. He is currently a Professor in the Department of Brain & Cognitive Sciences at the Massachusetts Institute of Technology.

References

External links
 

1962 births
Living people
Canadian male rowers
Olympic rowers of Canada
Rowers at the 1984 Summer Olympics
Rowers from Toronto